Electronic Attack Squadron 136 (VAQ-136) also known as "The Gauntlets" is a United States Navy electronic attack squadron flying the EA-18G Growler and is currently attached to Carrier Air Wing Two, a composite unit made up of a wide array of aircraft performing a variety of combat and support missions including F2T2EA. The squadron is currently stationed at Naval Air Station Whidbey Island.

History

1970s
Since establishment in 1969, VAQ-136 has been associated with several Carrier Air Wings. The squadron's first two deployments were with CVW-11 aboard . In 1977 the squadron joined CVW-7 aboard  for a cruise to the Mediterranean, after which the squadron changed to the  Improved Capability (ICAP) version of the EA-6B.

1980s
In 1987 the Commanding Officer of 136 and his three junior officers Lt John Carter (pilot), LT Doug Hora and LT Dave Gibson went missing during a routine night EMCON flight in the Indian Ocean. Commander Justin Greene was on the verge of completing his 1,000th carrier arrestment, his celebration cake was given a respectful deposit at sea uneaten. The plane and officers have never been found. The eulogy during USS Midways memorial service was delivered by Navy Lieutenant Daniel Shanower who later died (Captain US Navy) on September 11, 2001 at the Pentagon. In 1986, the squadron transitioned to ICAP II aircraft and deployed to support the 1988 Summer Olympics in Seoul, Korea. The squadron was awarded the COMNAVAIRPAC Battle Efficiency "E", and the Safety “S” in 1989.

1990s
On April 16, 1990, as part of the Cope Thunder exercise, the squadron successfully fired a live AGM-88 HARM missile at a U.S. Air Force target radar off the coast of the Philippines. It was the first AGM-88 fired in WESTPAC and the missile completely destroyed its target.

On January 17, 1991 the squadron flew strikes against Iraq in support of Operation Desert Storm. During the 43-day war, the squadron fired 28 AGM-88s against Iraqi air defenses, ensuring that CVW-5 did not lose any aircraft to enemy fire.

On August 22, 1991, the squadron cross-decked from USS Midway with CVW-5 to USS Independence at Naval Base Pearl Harbor, Hawaii. During this transfer it received several new EA-6Bs, including BuNo 163045 which would be later on be involved in a cable car accident in 1998. In early 1992, the squadron deployed with USS Independence in support of Operation Southern Watch. The squadron received the Pacific Fleet Battle Efficiency "E" award for 1992, the Radford Award for being the best EA-6B squadron in the Navy, the Association of Old Crows Outstanding Unit Award, and a Meritorious Unit Commendation.

In 1993 the squadron sailed to the Persian Gulf in support of Operation Southern Watch. That summer saw the squadron supporting U.S. policy during intense North Korean Contingency Operations. VAQ-136 was named the “Prowler Squadron of the Year for Tactical Excellence” for 1994.

The squadron began 1995 with operations in the Yellow Sea before proceeding south to participate in Exercise Cobra Gold off the coast of Thailand.  They then moved to the Middle East yet again participating in Operation Southern Watch. The squadron were awarded the COMNAVAIRPAC Battle Efficiency "E", and Safety “S” for 1995.

In 1996 VAQ-136 operated in the Yellow Sea, near the Philippines, and around Taiwan to deter Chinese aggression. Early in 1997 USS Independence commenced a four month cruise, transiting to Guam, Australia, Malaysia, Singapore, Thailand, and then Hong Kong, the last U.S. carrier to port there before its reversion to Chinese control.

In January 1998 the squadron made an emergency, no-notice deployment to the Persian Gulf in support of Operation Southern Watch.  The squadron returned home for a brief respite before getting underway again in July, this time to Hawaii to cross-deck onto their new home, .  The squadron received the Safety “S” for the first half of 1998.

In January 1999, VAQ-136 was awarded the 1998 COMNAVAIRPAC Battle Efficiency "E". On March 2, 1999, VAQ-136 and the Kitty Hawk Battle group departed Yokosuka, Japan for three months of routine operations and exercises in the Western Pacific. The squadron participated in the multi-national and multi-service exercise Tandem Thrust off Guam before USS Kitty Hawk was ordered to the Persian Gulf in support of Operation Southern Watch. Over the following eleven weeks, the squadron flew 115 combat sorties over the skies of Iraq. When Kitty Hawk pulled into Dubai, UAE, for several days of liberty, the squadron was tasked to provide uninterrupted Electronic Warfare support for coalition aircraft flying from Prince Sultan Air Base (PSAB), Saudi Arabia.

2000-2010s
In 2010, VAQ-136 was awarded the "Battle E" for combat efficiency and the "Golden Wrench" Award for maintenance excellence by Commander, Naval Air Forces.

In February 2012, the Navy announced that the squadron would transfer to Naval Air Station Whidbey Island in early 2012 to prepare for reequipping with the EA-18G Growler.

As of February 2013 they began flying the EA-18G Growler at NAS Whidbey Island with a tail code of "NG". In 2016 they were reassigned to Carrier Air Wing Two and changed to a tail code of "NE".

2020s

Following a successful underway period in support of Westpac and RIMPAC in late 2017, the Gauntlets entered a prolonged maintenance phase.  Of note, they were the very first Growler squadron to increase aircraft allotment from five to seven.  The "plus up" came with an accompanying increase in personnel, almost doubling the size of the ready room and substantially adding to maintenance manning.  The squadron began their workup cycle in summer of 2020 in anticipation of upcoming deployments with Carrier Air Wing Two, fondly dubbed "Air Wing of the Future" in reference to its complement of F-35C Lightning, high lot F/A-18E/F Super Hornet, MVB-22 Osprey and E-2D Advanced Hawkeye.

See also
Naval aviation
United States Naval Aviator
Modern US Navy carrier air operations
List of United States Navy aircraft squadrons
List of Inactive United States Navy aircraft squadrons
List of United States Navy aircraft designations (pre-1962) / List of US Naval aircraft

References

External links
 VAQ-136 Official Website
 Electronic Attack Squadron 136 Unofficial Homepage

Electronic attack squadrons of the United States Navy
Military units and formations in Washington (state)